The men's doubles soft tennis event was part of the soft tennis programme and took place between November 18 and 19, at the Tianhe Tennis School.

Schedule
All times are China Standard Time (UTC+08:00)

Results

Preliminary round

Group A

Group B

Group C

Group D

Group E

Group F

Knockout round

Final

Top half

Bottom half

References 

Official website

External links 
soft-tennis.org

Soft tennis at the 2010 Asian Games